Tales of Pangea  is the fourth studio album by Ana Alcaide, released on August 28, 2015 and a collaboration with Gotrasawala Ensemble. All ten tracks of the album are in the Sundanese language.

Track listing

Personnel
Taken from the album's booklet:

 Ana Alcaide - vocals, nyckelharpa
 Rudi Rodexz - vocals, bansing 
 Iman Jimbot - vocals, suling
 Novi Aksmiranti - vocals 
 Riky Oktriyadi - selentem, kendang, fram drums
 Bill Cooley - psalterium, ud
 Rudini Zhiter - kecapi
 Ray Sandoval - guitar 
 Rainer Seiferth - additional guitar

References

2015 albums
World music albums
Sundanese music
Sundanese language